The Jharkhand Vidhan Sabha or the Jharkhand Legislative Assembly is the unicameral state legislature of Jharkhand.

Members of Legislative Assembly

List of assemblies

See also 
List of Chief Ministers of Jharkhand
List of constituencies of the Jharkhand Legislative Assembly
List of deputy chief ministers of Jharkhand
List of speakers of the Jharkhand Legislative Assembly
List of leaders of the opposition in the Jharkhand Legislative Assembly

Notes

References 

 
State legislatures of India
Politics of Jharkhand
Unicameral legislatures
Government of Jharkhand